Participatory cinema tries to involve a film's community in the process of making movies, rather than interaction being left to cinema viewers at the end of the process. The organizers of participatory cinema open up cinema showings and the cinema production process for non professionals.

Where classic film production focuses on the final product, participatory cinema focuses on the process of making movies and its meaning on the participators.

Examples 

Participatory documentaries include RiP!: A Remix Manifesto.

Participatory feature films include projects like A Swarm of Angels, Iron Sky or The Cosmonaut.

Participatory film platforms and communities include A Swarm of Angels, Open Source Cinema, Sanctuary, The Cosmonaut and Wreck-A-Movie, The Rocky Horror Picture Show

See also
 Pro-am
 Not to be confused with: Interactive cinema
 Participatory video
 Perpetual art machine
 Public participation

Film production
Movements in cinema
Video art
Citizen media